Brunswick County is a United States county located on the southern border of the Commonwealth of Virginia. This rural county is known as one of the claimants to be the namesake of Brunswick stew. Brunswick County was created in 1720 from parts of Prince George, Surry and Isle of Wight counties.  The county was named for the former Duchy of Brunswick-Lunenburg, which was a British possession in the 18th century. As of the 2020 census, the county population was 15,849. The Brunswick county seat is Lawrenceville.

History 
The first English settlers, in what was to become Brunswick County, swarmed into the relatively protected lands near Fort Christanna during its 4 years of operation (1714–1718). Among them were indentured servants, including men deported from Scotland in 1716 after being convicted by the Crown in the Jacobite rising of 1715. They were required to work under indenture to pay the Crown back for their ship passage. Gradually the colonists pushed many of the Native Americans out of the area.

An example of such a Scots rebel who started in the colony as a convict was James Pittillo. He survived his indenture and in 1726 was granted  on Wagua Creek. He gradually became a major landowner in the area. He was appointed as a tobacco inspector in Bristol Parish in 1728 and that year served with William Byrd II on his spring and fall expeditions to survey the border between Virginia and North Carolina.

Brunswick County was established in 1720 from Prince George County. The county is named for the former Duchy of Brunswick-Lunenburg in Germany. One of the titles carried by Britain's Hanoverian kings was Duke of Brunswick-Lunenburg. In 1732 the county received more land from parts of Surry and Isle of Wight counties. Brunswick County reached the Blue Ridge Mountains until 1745, when increasing population in the region resulted in the formation of a series of new counties, and Brunswick's current western border was established.

In 1780, during the American Revolutionary War, Greensville County was formed from part of Brunswick's eastern side. In 1787 the county's eastern border was finalized with a minor adjustment.

Today Brunswick County is bisected by Interstate 85, U.S. 1 and U.S. Highway 58. Planters originally cultivated the land for tobacco by slave labor in colonial times. As tobacco exhausted the soil and the markets changed, planters and smaller farmers diversified the mostly rural economy by raising mixed crops and harvesting lumber before the American Civil War. As a result of these changes, slaveholders in the Upper South had surplus slaves; many sold them in the domestic slave trade. It fed the development of cotton plantations in the Deep South. Altogether, more than one million enslaved African Americans were sold South in the antebellum years in this forced migration, which broke up many families.

Saint Paul's College, Virginia was established in this county in association with the Episcopal Church.  In 1914 the school boasted that "The location of the school in the heart of the Black Belt of Virginia, with a Negro population of 100,000 almost at its very doors, is most favorable for the prosecution of uplift work." St. Paul's closed its doors in 2013.

In the early 21st century, the county has a campus of Southside Virginia Community College. The Fort Pickett Army National Guard base is partly in the county.

Geography

Adjacent counties
Mecklenburg County – west
Lunenburg County – west
Nottoway County – northwest
Dinwiddie County – north
Greensville County – east
Northampton County, North Carolina – south

Major highways

Demographics

2020 census

Note: the US Census treats Hispanic/Latino as an ethnic category. This table excludes Latinos from the racial categories and assigns them to a separate category. Hispanics/Latinos can be of any race.

2010 Census
As of the 2010 United States Census, there were 17,434 people living in the county. 57.3% were Black or African American, 40.4% White, 0.3% Asian, 0.2% Native American, 0.8% of some other race and 0.9% of two or more races. 1.7% were Hispanic or Latino (of any race).

As of the census of 2000, there were 18,419 people, 6,277 households, and 4,312 families living in the county.  The population density was 32 people per square mile (13/km2).  There were 7,541 housing units at an average density of 13 per square mile (5/km2).  The racial makeup of the county was 41.99% White, 56.85% Black or African American, 0.09% Native American, 0.22% Asian, 0.01% Pacific Islander, 0.34% from other races, and 0.51% from two or more races.  1.25% of the population were Hispanic or Latino of any race.

There were 6,277 households, out of which 27.40% had children under the age of 18 living with them, 46.90% were married couples living together, 16.60% had a female householder with no husband present, and 31.30% were non-families. 27.60% of all households were made up of individuals, and 13.30% had someone living alone who was 65 years of age or older.  The average household size was 2.47 and the average family size was 3.00.

In the county, the age distribution of the population shows 20.50% under the age of 18, 9.90% from 18 to 24, 30.70% from 25 to 44, 24.40% from 45 to 64, and 14.50% who were 65 years of age or older.  The median age was 38 years. For every 100 females there were 113.10 males.  For every 100 females age 18 and over, there were 115.40 males.

The median income for a household in the county was $31,288, and the median income for a family was $38,354. Males had a median income of $26,924 versus $20,550 for females. The per capita income for the county was $14,890.  About 13.20% of families and 16.50% of the population were below the poverty line, including 20.10% of those under age 18 and 19.50% of those age 65 or over.

Government

Board of Supervisors
Meherrin district: John Zubrod (I)
Powellton district: Chair Welton Tyler (I)
Red Oak district: Bernard L. Jones, Sr. (I)
Sturgeon district: Vice-Chair Dr. Alfonzo R. Seward (I)
Totaro district: Dr. Barbara Jarrett-Harris (I)

Constitutional officers
Clerk of the Circuit Court: Jacqueline Seward-Morgan (I)
Commissioner of the Revenue: Camilla Clayton-Bright
Commonwealth's Attorney: Lezlie S. Green (I)
Sheriff: Brian Roberts (V)
Treasurer: Jackie Mangrum (I)

Brunswick County is represented by Republican Frank M. Ruff, Jr. and Democrat L. Louise Lucas in the Virginia Senate, Republican Otto Wachsmann in the Virginia House of Delegates, and Republican Bob Good in the U.S. House of Representatives.

County government
The Virginia Department of Corrections Brunswick Correctional Center was in an unincorporated area near Lawrenceville.

Economy & Brunswick stew 
Brunswick County is best known as the origin place for Brunswick stew. The original Brunswick stew, according to Brunswick County historians, was created in 1828 by an African-American chef, Mr. Jimmy Matthews, also referred to as "Uncle" by some locals.  As the story goes, Dr. Creed Haskins of Mount Donum on the Nottoway River, a member of the Virginia State Legislature, took several friends on a hunting expedition.  While the group hunted, Mr. Matthews, Haskin's enslaved camp cook, hunted squirrel for the evening meal. Mr. Matthews slowly stewed the squirrels in butter, with onions, stale bread and seasoning in a large iron pot.  When the hunting party returned, they were reluctant to try the new, thick concoction, but one taste convinced them to ask for more.

Since that time, Brunswick stew has been prepared by many different "stew masters." It is often associated with the harvest season in the fall and completion of tobacco processing.  Cooks produce large batches of the "Virginia ambrosia" for church functions, local fund raisers, family reunions, and political rallies.  Each cook and generation adds its variations to Jimmy Matthews's recipe for Brunswick stew: chicken has been substituted for squirrel and vegetables have been added.

During 1987, the Brunswick Industrial Development Commission and a committee of the Brunswick Chamber of Commerce, with the aid of a professional advertising agency, began a program to develop balanced economic growth in Brunswick County. They decided to capitalize on the county's home-grown Brunswick stew as a brand. On February 22, 1988, at the State Capitol in Richmond, Brunswick County officially kicked off a campaign to increase awareness of its economic development opportunities.  The Brunswick Chamber of Commerce and the County of Brunswick hosted a Brunswick Stew-Fest on the Capitol grounds to celebrate the General Assembly's passing of a resolution proclaiming Brunswick County, Virginia, as "The Original Home of Brunswick Stew".  The proclamation contains a tongue-in-cheek jab at Brunswick, Georgia, which claims to have created the traditional Southern dish, setting off what has been coined as "The Stew Wars."

One of the many traditional recipes, which requires 6 to 7 hours to cook, was renamed Brunswick Proclamation Stew for the occasion.  A good Brunswick stew must be cooked down slowly, according to stew masters for the Capitol Square event, "Until the stirring paddle stands up straight in the stew."  When the paddle stood, Brunswick stew was served to the legislators and hundreds of Virginians who turned out for the event to "Get a Taste of Brunswick."
  
With the help of the Fearnow Brothers, the County got its own stew label, approved by the U.S. Department of Agriculture (USDA). Their company also produces small quantities of canned Brunswick stew for the Chamber of Commerce to store and use.  The cans bear the label "Virginia's Own – 1828-Brunswick County Stew".
  
A sample of Brunswick stew, along with information on the County's assets, was included in the County's promotional packages and sent to business and industry prospects.  The stew and County are tied together with the campaign's theme: "Since 1828 when Ol’ Jimmy Matthews created Brunswick stew, we’ve been doing things a special way.  A little slow, but right."

Communities

Towns
Alberta
Brodnax (partial)
Lawrenceville (county seat)

Census-designated places
Ebony
Gasburg
Warfield

Unincorporated communities
Dolphin
Freeman
White Plains
Wyche

Notable people
 Aaron Brown (1795–1859), Governor of Tennessee
 Albertis Harrison (1907–1995) Governor of Virginia
 George Jackson (1850–1900), American politician
 Goronwy Owen (1723-1769) Welsh-American poet, Episcopalian Vicar, and cotton and tobacco plantation owner
 Hon. Cleo Powell (1957- ), Justice on the Supreme Court of Virginia
 Peter Starke (1813–1888), politician and Confederate general
 Bryant Stith (1970- ), NBA basketball player

See also

National Register of Historic Places listings in Brunswick County, Virginia

References

External links
https://web.archive.org/web/20110128190417/http://www.brunswickco.com/

 
1720 establishments in Virginia
Virginia counties
Black Belt (U.S. region)
Populated places established in 1720
Majority-minority counties and independent cities in Virginia